John Wilshere (born 5 May 1978) is a Papua New Guinean former professional rugby league footballer who last played for the Salford City Reds.

Playing career
Wilshere had represented Papua New Guinea many times and was a key player in their squad at the 2008 Rugby League World Cup in Australia.

His previous clubs included the Leigh Centurions, Warrington Wolves and the National Rugby League's St George Illawarra Dragons and Melbourne Storm.

Wilshere scored 538 points for the Norths Devils in the Queensland Cup.

Wilshere scored 358 points for the Easts Tigers in the Queensland Cup.

Representative career
Wilshere was captain of the Papua New Guinea national rugby league team for the 2008 Rugby League World Cup. Wilshere was named as part of the Papua New Guinea squad for the 2009 Pacific Cup.

On 7 November 2009, Wilshere announced his retirement from the Kumuls.

References

External links
Salford profile

1978 births
Living people
Eastern Suburbs Tigers players
Expatriate rugby league players in Australia
Expatriate rugby league players in England
Leigh Leopards players
Melbourne Storm players
Norths Devils players
Papua New Guinea national rugby league team captains
Papua New Guinea national rugby league team players
Papua New Guinean expatriate rugby league players
Papua New Guinean expatriate sportspeople in Australia
Papua New Guinean expatriate sportspeople in the United Kingdom
Papua New Guinean rugby league players
Rugby league fullbacks
Rugby league wingers
Salford Red Devils players
St. George Illawarra Dragons players
Warrington Wolves players
Western Reds players